Status Quo are a British rock band that formed in 1962. The group originated in London as The Scorpions and was founded by Francis Rossi and Alan Lancaster while they were still schoolboys. After a number of lineup changes, which included the introduction of John Coghlan in 1963 and Rick Parfitt in 1967, the band became The Status Quo in 1967 and Status Quo in 1969. As of 2022, the group have been active for 60 consecutive years (despite announcing a breakup in 1984, they would play Live Aid the following year and resume normal activities in 1986).

They have had over 60 chart hits in the UK - more than any other rock band - including "Pictures of Matchstick Men", "Down Down", "Rockin' All Over the World", "Whatever You Want", "In the Army Now", and "What You're Proposing". Twenty-two of these reached the Top 10 in the UK Singles Chart, and fifty-seven reached the Top 40. They have released over 100 singles and 33 albums, most of which were bestsellers. Since reaching number 5 on the UK albums chart in 1972 with Piledriver, Status Quo have achieved a career total of 25 UK top ten albums, extending all the way up to their most recent release, Backbone, in 2019. As of 2015, they were one of only 50 artists to have ever achieved more than 500 total weeks on the UK Albums Chart. With their various records for both single and album releases, Status Quo are one of the most successful bands of all time in the UK.

In July 1985 the band opened Live Aid at Wembley Stadium with "Rockin' All Over the World". In 1991, Status Quo received a Brit Award for Outstanding Contribution to Music. Status Quo appeared on the BBC's Top of the Pops more than any other band. Their success and longevity as well, in part, as their connections to the British Royal Family, including philanthropic work with the Prince's Trust, have seen them frequently described as a "national institution" by the media.

History

1962–1967: Formative years

Status Quo was formed in 1962 under the name The Scorpions by Francis Rossi and Alan Lancaster at Sedgehill Comprehensive School, Catford, London, along with classmates Jess Jaworski (keyboards) and Alan Key (drums). Rossi and Lancaster played their first gig at the Samuel Jones Sports Club in Dulwich, London. In 1963, Key was replaced by John Coghlan and the band changed their name to The Spectres. After changing their name, Lancaster's father arranged for the group to perform weekly at a venue called the Samuel Jones Sports Club, where they were noticed by Pat Barlow, a gasfitter and budding pop music manager. Barlow became the group's manager and secured them spots at venues around London, such as El Partido in Lewisham and Café des Artistes in Chelsea. In 1965, when Rossi, Lancaster and Jaworski left school, Jaworski opted to leave the band and was replaced by Roy Lynes.

They began writing their own material, and later that year met Rick Parfitt who was playing with a cabaret band called The Highlights. By the end of 1965, Rossi and Parfitt – who had become close friends after meeting at Butlins – made a commitment to continue working together. On 18 July 1966, the Spectres signed a five-year deal with Piccadilly Records, releasing two singles that year, "Hurdy Gurdy Man" (written by Alan Lancaster) and "I (Who Have Nothing)", and one the next year called "(We Ain't Got) Nothin' Yet" (a song originally recorded by New York psychedelic band the Blues Magoos). All three singles failed to make an impact on the charts.

By 1967, the group had discovered psychedelia and named themselves Traffic, but were soon forced to change it to Traffic Jam to avoid confusion with Steve Winwood's Traffic, following an argument over who had registered the name first. The band secured an appearance on BBC Radio's Saturday Club, but in June their next single, "Almost But Not Quite There", underperformed. The following month saw Parfitt, at the request of manager Pat Barlow, joining the band as rhythm guitarist and vocalist. Shortly after Parfitt's recruitment, in August 1967, the band officially became The Status Quo.

1968: "Pictures of Matchstick Men" and psychedelic era
In January 1968, the group released the psychedelic-flavoured "Pictures of Matchstick Men". The song hit the UK Singles Chart, reaching number seven; "Matchstick Men" became the group's only Top 40 hit in the United States, peaking at number twelve on the Billboard Hot 100. Although Status Quo's albums have been released in the United States throughout their career, they never achieved the same level of success there as they have in Britain. Though the follow-up was the unsuccessful single "Black Veils of Melancholy", they had a hit again the same year with a pop song penned by Marty Wilde and Ronnie Scott, "Ice in the Sun", which climbed to number eight. All three singles were included on the band's first album Picturesque Matchstickable Messages from the Status Quo, released in September 1968. After the breakthrough, the band management hired Bob Young as a roadie and tour manager. Over the years Young became one of the most important songwriting partners for Status Quo, in addition to playing harmonica with them on stage and on record.

1969–1981: Spare Parts to Never Too Late

After their second album, 1969's Spare Parts, failed commercially, the band's musical direction moved away from psychedelia towards a more hard rock/boogie rock sound. The change in sound also brought a change in image, away from Carnaby Street fashions to faded denims and T-shirts, an image which was to become their trademark throughout the 1970s. Lynes left the band in 1970 and was replaced in the studio by guests including keyboard player Jimmy Horowitz and Tom Parker. By 1976, Andy Bown – an ex-member of The Herd, Judas Jump and the Peter Frampton Band – was brought in to cover keyboards, although as he was contracted as a solo artist with EMI he was not credited as an official member of Status Quo until 1982.

After two relatively poor-selling albums, Ma Kelly's Greasy Spoon and Dog of Two Head in 1970 and 1971, their return to commercial success came when they signed with the heavy rock and progressive label Vertigo. Their first album for Vertigo, Piledriver, was released in 1972 and heralded an even heavier, self-produced sound. This album was essentially the stylistic template for their next four albums, Hello! (1973), Quo (1974), On the Level (1975) and Blue for You (1976). In 1977, the group released the top 3 charting double Live! album. Quo's hit singles from this era include "Paper Plane" (No. 8 in the UK chart) (1972), "Caroline" (No. 5 in the UK chart) (1973), "Break The Rules", (No. 8 in the UK chart) (1974), "Down Down" (No. 1 in the UK chart) (1975), "Roll Over Lay Down" (No. 10 in the UK chart) (1975), "Rain" (No. 7 in the UK chart) (1976), "Mystery Song" (No. 11 in the UK chart) (1976), "Wild Side of Life" (No. 9 in the UK chart) (1976), "Rockin' All Over the World" (No. 3 in the UK chart) (1977), "Again and Again" (No. 13 in the UK chart) (1978), "Whatever You Want" (No. 4 in the UK Chart) (1979), "Living on an Island" (No. 16 in the UK chart) (1979), "What You're Proposing" (No. 2 in the UK chart) (1980), the double A-side "Lies" and "Don't Drive My Car" (No. 11 in the UK charts) (1980), "Somethin' 'Bout You Baby I Like" (No. 9 in the UK chart) (1981) and " Rock 'n' Roll" (No. 8 in the UK chart) (1981). "Down Down" topped the UK Singles Chart in January 1975, becoming their only UK No. 1 single to date. In 1976, they signed a pioneering sponsorship deal with Levi's. Quo have now sold approximately 118 million records worldwide.

From 1977 onwards, the band's sound became more polished as they began to employ outside producers. These included Pip Williams, Roger Glover, and John Eden. Glover was the first outside producer to work with Quo since Pye's John Schroeder in the early 1970s, and produced "Wild Side of Life" and its B-side "All Through The Night" in 1976. Rockin' All Over the World (1977), If You Can't Stand the Heat... (1978) and Whatever You Want (1979) were produced by Williams, while Just Supposin' (1980) and Never Too Late (1981) were produced by Eden.

The title track of Rockin' All Over the World, a minor hit for its writer John Fogerty (formerly of Creedence Clearwater Revival), became one of Status Quo's most enduring anthems. Sales remained high in the UK throughout the 1980s.

1981–1990: Lineup changes, Live Aid and In The Army Now
Tensions within the band saw Coghlan leaving late in 1981. His replacement early the following year was Pete Kircher from the 1960s pop band Honeybus. Andy Bown joined the band in an official capacity at this time. This line-up recorded three albums, 1+9+8+2, Live at the N.E.C. and Back to Back in 1982 and 1983. Although contracted to record more albums, this line-up played its last full-length gig on 21 July 1984 at the Milton Keynes Bowl. "Everybody was coked-up and hating each other", Rossi recalled, "and I'd started drinking tequila on that tour. I don't remember that show at all – the encores or anything; just falling flat on my back at one point." "Deciding to retire from the road – all that was about was getting Francis a solo career," declared Lancaster. "Nobody on the outside knew it, but he didn't want to work with me or Rick anymore."

Status Quo's final appearance with the Kircher line-up opened the Live Aid charity event at Wembley Stadium in July 1985. That year, Rossi recorded and released two solo singles with long-time writing partner Bernie Frost. Parfitt recorded a solo album, Recorded Delivery, with bass player John "Rhino" Edwards and drummer Jeff Rich. The album remains unreleased, although some tracks were reworked and released sporadically as Quo B-sides until 1987.

In mid-1985, Rossi, Parfitt and Bown, with Edwards and Rich, started work on a new Quo album. Lancaster – by this time more or less settled in Australia – took out a legal injunction to stop the band using the Status Quo name on records, citing increasing musical differences, notably during sessions for Back to Back. The specific dispute concerned two tracks that became hits for the group around that time. Lancaster had co-written "Ol' Rag Blues", but was angered when the producers chose to release a version with Rossi singing the lead vocal instead of one sung by himself. The injunction also prevented the release of a single, "Naughty Girl", for which a catalogue number was issued by Vertigo.

An out-of-court settlement was made in January 1986, enabling the new Status Quo line-up to continue recording In The Army Now, for which "Naughty Girl" was reworked as "Dreamin'". Lancaster remained in Australia, and in 1986 joined an Australian supergroup, The Party Boys, featuring Angry Anderson of Rose Tattoo, John Brewster of the Angels and Kevin Borich, but achieved little success outside Australia. Lancaster left Status Quo formally in 1987.

In 1986, Quo supported Queen on the latter's Magic Tour. The commercially successful In the Army Now album was released later that year. Its title track became one of the band's biggest UK singles, reaching number 2. The following album, Ain't Complaining, in 1988, was less successful but produced the number 5 hit "Burning Bridges". Rerecorded (with new lyrics) in April 1994 with Manchester United F.C. as "Come On You Reds", the single would have given the band their second UK Number 1, but it was credited as 'by Manchester United'. The following album, 1989's Perfect Remedy, became their first since 1971's Dog of Two Head not to go Top 20 in the UK.

1991–2009: Rock 'Til You Drop, "Fun, Fun, Fun" and touring
The early-to-mid-1990s saw falling album sales for the band. To promote the release of the Rock 'til You Drop album (1991), Quo performed four arena gigs in Sheffield, Glasgow, Birmingham and London in the space of 12 hours, earning them a place in the Guinness Book of World Records. 1992 brought the band's third live album, Live Alive Quo. The next studio album, 1994's Thirsty Work, included a cover of the Jennifer Warnes song "I'm Restless" revealing an alternative and lighter sound to the band. Don't Stop (1996), and Famous in the Last Century (2000) consisted almost entirely of cover versions, (with the only exception being the title track to the latter).  The former brought some chart success for Quo with covers of Fleetwood Mac's "Don't Stop" and The Beach Boys' "Fun, Fun, Fun". The band became involved in an acrimonious dispute with Radio 1 after the station refused to include the "Fun Fun Fun" single on the radio station's playlist.

In 1993, Francis Rossi and Rick Parfitt attracted a crowd of over 25,000 when they performed the annual Blackpool Illuminations lights switch-on.

Parfitt underwent quadruple by-pass surgery in 1997, but was able to make a full recovery and returned with a performance at the Norwich City Football Club ground Carrow Road three months later. Status Quo also returned to Australia in 1997, completing their first tour there since 1978. A greatest hits compilation, Whatever You Want – The Very Best of Status Quo was also released, achieving silver sales in the UK that year. In 1999, Quo toured Germany, the Netherlands and Switzerland. Dubbed the 'Last Night of the Proms', the band were backed by a full orchestra during the concerts. That same year also saw the release of the album Under the Influence.

Rich left in 2000 and was replaced by Matt Letley. Andrew Bown also took a year off at the same time following the death of his wife, and was temporarily replaced on stage by Paul Hirsh, formerly of Voyager.

In November 2000, the band played a gig at Grandchester in the outback in Australia, performing on a carriage of Australia's Orient Express, the Great South Pacific Express.

Between 2002 and 2005, Quo released the albums Heavy Traffic, Riffs and The Party Ain't Over Yet.

In 2005 Rossi and Parfitt made cameo appearances in the long-running ITV soap opera Coronation Street in a storyline which involved them being sued by the notorious layabout Les Battersby, and performing live at his wedding as compensation.

In December 2005, it was announced that Parfitt had been taken ill and was undergoing tests for throat cancer. All subsequent dates of the UK tour were cancelled as a result. However, the growths in Parfitt's throat were later found to be benign and were successfully removed. In May 2006, a fully recovered Parfitt and the band returned to the NEC Birmingham to play the show that they had postponed in December. This was their 40th show at the venue, and was filmed for a DVD, entitled Just Doin' It.

On 1 July 2007, they performed in front of 63,000 people at the newly built Wembley Stadium as part of the Concert for Diana. They also appeared on the TV programme Tiswas Reunited, in which the band got the usual greeting of custard pies and buckets of water whilst playing the song, "Gerdundula".

On 15 September 2007, Rossi and Parfitt appeared on ITV programme Who Wants To Be A Millionaire and won £50,000 for their 2 charities Ebbisham Association and Nordoff Robbins.

Their twenty-eighth studio album, In Search of the Fourth Chord, was released on the band's own Fourth Chord label in September 2007 in the UK, and on Edel Records in the rest of Europe. The title is a self-satirical response to the frequent criticism that they are a three-chord band. Produced by veteran producer Pip Williams, who had worked with Quo in the studio since 1977, the album was only moderately successful.

In 2008, they teamed up with German techno group Scooter to record a jumpstyle version of their 1979 single "Whatever You Want" entitled "Jump That Rock (Whatever You Want)". In December 2008, they released their 75th single and first Christmas single, entitled "It's Christmas Time", which peaked at No. 40 in the UK Singles Chart.

2010–2013: Hello Quo, "Frantic Four" reunion tours and Bula Quo!

Rossi and Parfitt were each awarded the OBE in the 2010 New Year Honours for services to music. Their long-standing work for charities includes The Prince's Trust, British Heart Foundation and Nordoff-Robbins Music Therapy.

Classic Rock magazine had reported on 17 March 2010 that the band had patched up their relationship with Alan Lancaster, and were discussing the possibility of a future collaboration. The article stated "While the band are back on friendly terms with Alan, it's unlikely we'll see any future reunion, with Quo continuing as normal and Lancaster busy with charity events and overseeing the activities of his son's band The Presence".

On 20 September 2010, Status Quo was honoured with a PRS for Music plaque commemorating their first gig at the Welcome Inn in Well Hall Road, Eltham, where the band first performed in 1967.

On 26 September 2010, a new version of "In the Army Now" was released through Universal / UMC. All profits from this updated and lyrically reworked version will be donated equally to the British Forces Foundation and Help for Heroes charities.

A box set of sessions, live concerts and TV appearances at the BBC was released on 25 October 2010, titled Live at the BBC. The full 7CD + 1DVD version covers almost all appearances, while the 2CD and 4CD versions present some highlights. The DVD was also released individually. 

Their twenty-ninth studio album, Quid Pro Quo, was released in a deluxe format exclusively at Tesco on 30 May 2011.  The regular edition was released elsewhere on 7 June. The album peaked at number 10 in the UK chart.

December 2011 saw Status Quo undertake their first all-arenas UK winter tour. Quo also performed for the first time at The O2 in London. The tour was dubbed Quofest and featured Roy Wood and Kim Wilde as support for all shows. They joined the band during the encore.

In August 2011, Status Quo began filming their first cinematic documentary with film director Alan G. Parker and Producer Alexa Morris. Entitled Hello Quo!, the production opened in cinemas on 22 October 2012. A Blu-ray/DVD release followed, through Anchor Bay Productions, on 29 October. The movie included contributions from Brian May, Jeff Lynne, Cliff Richard, Joe Elliott, Paul Weller, Joe Brown, Jim Lea, Andy Scott and Steve Diggle.

In April 2012, Status Quo announced they were shooting their first feature film, over several weeks in Fiji. A 90-minute action comedy, entitled Bula Quo!, taking its name from the islanders' traditional Fijian greeting, and also referencing the title of the band's best-selling album, Hello! featuring the band as themselves, and also starring Jon Lovitz, Craig Fairbrass and Laura Aikman. The film was directed by Stuart St. Paul, produced by Tim Major and was released in cinemas on 5 July 2013. The film was accompanied by a soundtrack album of the same name, the band's 30th studio album, released on 10 June. It featured nine new songs and ten re-records and live tracks. Bula Quo! debuted in the UK chart at number 10.

On 9 July 2012, the band released the single "The Winner" for the 2012 Summer Olympics. In July 2012 Coles, an Australian national supermarket chain, signed Status Quo to record a version of "Down Down" using Coles' tag line 'Down, down, prices are down'. In September 2012, the band performed at Hyde Park for BBC Radio 2 Live in Hyde Park. In November 2012, Coles continued their association with Status Quo, producing a series of television adverts with the band appearing and performing "It's Christmas Time". In 2013, new adverts were released by Coles with Quo using "Whatever You Want" as the new jingle.

In December that year, Quo toured under the Quofest banner for a second year, this time supported by Bonnie Tyler and Eddie and the Hot Rods. On 17 December 2012, Matt Letley announced his decision to leave the band after 12 years, and subsequently departed following completion of their 2012 winter tour. However, Letley toured with Quo their Australia and Mexico tour in March and April 2013, due to limited time to find a new drummer after the Frantic Four Tour.

The 1970–81 line-up (Francis Rossi, Rick Parfitt, Alan Lancaster and John Coghlan) reunited in March 2013 for a series of dates in Manchester, Wolverhampton, Glasgow and London.  The last date of the tour, at Wembley Arena on 17 March, was filmed for a DVD, released in September 2013.

In May 2013 Leon Cave became Quo's new drummer. In the latter months of 2013, Status Quo embarked on their Bula Quo tour, supported by Uriah Heep on German dates, and by 10cc in the UK. This was followed by nine concert dates in the UK during 2014. On 25 November 2013, it was announced that Status Quo would headline the second stage at the Download Festival in June 2014.

2014–present: Aquostic, Parfitt's death and Backbone
In January 2014, Wychwood Brewery announced they would be releasing a Status Quo brand of beer, named after their 1972 album Piledriver, exclusively in JD Wetherspoon pubs across the UK in February, before going on general sale in April. March 2014 saw the second 'Frantic Four' reunion tour featuring Rossi and Parfitt with original members Lancaster and Coghlan with their last gig being at The O2 in Dublin, which was filmed for DVD release. Rossi indicated that this would be the last reunion tour of the 'Frantic Four' line-up. On 8 March 2014, Rossi and Parfitt appeared on ITV show Ant & Dec's Saturday Night Takeaway performing "Rockin' All Over the World" with McBusted.

In August 2014, it was reported that founding keyboardist Jess Jaworski had died. In October 2014, Parfitt and Rossi appeared on BBC's The One Show, performing an acoustic version of "Pictures of Matchstick Men". In May 2015, the twosome appeared on BBC's Later... with Jools Holland, to talk about their Aquostic – Stripped Bare album. On 9 May 2015, they performed "In the Army Now" at the VE Day 70: A Party to Remember.

On 22 October 2014 the band launched the Aquostic album with a 90-minute performance at London's Roundhouse, with the concert recorded and broadcast live by BBC Radio 2 as part of their In Concert series. Footage from the concert was later used, interspersed with interviews with Rossi and Parfitt, in BBC Four's Status Quo: Live and Acoustic, in January 2017. A live album and DVD of the concert, both titled Aquostic – Live at the Roundhouse, were issued in 2015.

On 5 June 2015 Status Quo were the headline act at Palmerston Park in Dumfries, at the stadium of Queen of the South and were supported by Reef and Big Country, in the first ever live concert at the venue.

On 1 February 2016, it was announced that Status Quo, in addition to the spring and summer dates already scheduled, would tour Europe starting in October. The final dates would take place in the UK towards the end of the year, after which the group would retire from playing 'electric' tours. The 'Last of The Electrics' tour was subsequently extended into 2017, with additional concerts outside the UK.

In September 2016 the band performed, in Aquostic line-up, at BBC Radio 2's Live in Hyde Park from Hyde Park, London for the second time.

The band's next album Aquostic II – That's a Fact! was released on 21 October 2016.

On 28 October 2016, Parfitt permanently retired from live performances after suffering a heart attack earlier the same year. On 24 December, he died in hospital in Marbella, Spain as a result of severe infection, after suffering an injury to his shoulder. Parfitt's funeral was held at Woking Crematorium on 19 January 2017. Irish guitarist Richie Malone, who had substituted for Parfitt during some 2016 live shows, took his place in the group on rhythm guitar, playing on both recorded material and at live shows. The band had to postpone a concert in June 2017 after frontman Rossi became ill.

2017 and 2018 saw the releases of three new live albums, The Last Night of the Electrics, Down Down and Dirty at Wacken and Down Down and Dignified at the Royal Albert Hall, with the former two also having companion DVD releases. In June 2019, Status Quo were the special guests for Lynyrd Skynyrd, on their UK farewell tour.

On 14 June 2019, the band announced that they were working on Backbone, their 33rd studio album – the first Status Quo studio album not to feature Parfitt. On 25 August 2019, the band appeared on ITV show The Sara Cox Show where Rossi spoke about the new album Backbone and also his autobiography I Talk Too Much, after which they performed an upcoming track called "Liberty Lane" as well as "Rockin' All Over the World". The album was released on 6 September 2019 and it reached number 6 in the UK Albums Chart. On 15 September 2019, the band performed at BBC Radio 2's Live in Hyde Park from Hyde Park, London for the third time. They were third from top of the bill, playing in the early evening and followed by Westlife and then The Pet Shop Boys. On Christmas Day 2019, the band appeared on Channel 4's The Great British Bake Off, performing "Rockin' All Over the World". On 11 August 2020, Status Quo cancelled their forty-date Backbone UK and European tour because of the COVID-19 pandemic. Various commitments for the following year meant the band were unable to reschedule the shows in 2021. On 20 August 2020, Rossi appeared on ITV daytime show This Morning and spoke about what he was doing during lockdown and the pandemic, and announced a new tour called Out Out Quoing to be scheduled for 2022.

On 26 September 2021, co-founder Alan Lancaster died at the age of 72 following a battle with multiple sclerosis.

Touring
Status Quo have performed a career total of at least 3700 documented gigs as of September 2022. After the addition of early undocumented gigs and various lost performances, the concert total is likely to be higher and is estimated by the band to be over 6000, with an audience in excess of 25 million people. The band have performed over a hundred gigs in a single year several times, with the recorded peak of 144 (1971) resulting in a live show every 2.5 days. The band calculated that after 48 years of touring activity, they had "travelled some four million miles and spent 23 years away from home". With the sole exceptions of 1980 and 1985, Status Quo embarked on multinational tours every year between 1968 and 2019 (predominantly in Europe, though they have visited every populated continent). The band took a complete break from touring in 2020 and 2021, including cancelling the largely sold-out Backbone album tour, in part due to restrictions imposed by the global response to COVID-19. They are touring again as of 2022, with extra dates added to their 2022 Out Out Quoing tour.

Personnel

Current members
 Francis Rossi – lead guitar, vocals 
 Andy Bown – keyboards, rhythm guitar, harmonica, vocals 
 John "Rhino" Edwards – bass, rhythm guitar, vocals 
 Leon Cave – drums, percussion, backing vocals 
 Richie Malone – rhythm guitar, vocals 

Former members
 Rick Parfitt – rhythm guitar, vocals 
 Alan Lancaster – bass, vocals 
 John Coghlan – drums, percussion 
 Roy Lynes – keyboards, vocals 
 Pete Kircher – drums, percussion, vocals 
 Jeff Rich – drums, percussion 
 Matt Letley – drums, percussion, vocals 
 Jess Jaworski – keyboards 
 Alan Key – drums, percussion

Discography

'Studio albumsPicturesque Matchstickable Messages from the Status Quo (1968)Spare Parts (1969)Ma Kelly's Greasy Spoon (1970)Dog of Two Head (1971)Piledriver (1972)Hello! (1973)Quo (1974)On the Level (1975)Blue for You (1976)Rockin' All Over the World (1977)If You Can't Stand the Heat... (1978)Whatever You Want (1979)Just Supposin' (1980)Never Too Late (1981)1+9+8+2 (1982)Back to Back (1983)In the Army Now (1986)Ain't Complaining (1988)Perfect Remedy (1989)Rock 'til You Drop (1991)Thirsty Work (1994)Don't Stop (1996)Under the Influence (1999)Famous in the Last Century (2000)Heavy Traffic (2002)Riffs (2003)The Party Ain't Over Yet (2005)In Search of the Fourth Chord (2007)Quid Pro Quo (2011)Bula Quo! (2013)Aquostic – Stripped Bare (2014)Aquostic II – That's a Fact! (2016)Backbone (2019)

Remakes and cover versions

In 1989, American alternative rock group Camper Van Beethoven scored a number one hit on Billboard magazine's Modern Rock Tracks chart with a cover version of "Pictures of Matchstick Men". The song is from their album Key Lime Pie. British alternative rock band Kasabian released their own cover version of the same song as a B-side from their 2006 single Shoot the Runner.
The 1996 re-issue of the album Too-Rye-Ay by Dexys Midnight Runners contained a cover version of "Marguerita Time".
Ozzy Osbourne, backed by Type O Negative, covered "Pictures of Matchstick Men" as part of the soundtrack to the Howard Stern biographical movie Private Parts in 1997.
Towards the end of his life, DJ John Peel was known for playing "Down Down" as part of his eclectic DJ sets.
Arjen Lucassen (from the Dutch project Ayreon) covered "Pictures Of Matchstick Men" and "Ice in the Sun" on his solo album Strange Hobby.
Bad Religion guitarist Brett Gurewitz recorded a cover version of "Pictures of Matchstick Men", on his 1985 solo album Seeing Eye Gods.
German power metal band Helloween covered "Rain" for their single "Power". It can also be found on the bonus disc of the special edition of their 1996 album, The Time of the Oath.

References

Further reading
John Shearlaw, Bob Young: Again & Again. Sidgwick & Jackson, October 1984, Paperback,  (1st edition (1979) and 2nd edition (1982) as The Authorised Biography by John Shearlaw)
Tom Hibbert: Status Quo. Omnibus Press, 1982, 
Neil Jeffries: Rockin' All Over the World. Proteus Books, March 1985, Paperback, 
Bob Young: Quotographs – Celebrating 30 Years of Status Quo, IMP International Music Publications Limited, 1985, 
Francis Rossi, Rick Parfitt: Just For The Record. Bantam Press, September 1994, hardcover, 
Patti Parfitt: Laughing All over the World: My Life Married to Status Quo. Blake Publishing Ltd, October 1998, 
David J. Oxley: Rockers Rollin' – The Story of Status Quo. ST Publishing, Januar 2000, Paperback, 
David J. Oxley: Tuned To The Music of Status Quo. ST Publishing, 2001, Paperback, 
Francis Rossi, Rick Parfitt, Mick Wall: Status Quo. XS All Areas. Sidgwick & Jackson, September 2004, hardcover,  (paperback edition: Macmillan Publishers Ltd, August 2005)
Francis Rossi, Rick Parfitt, Bob Young: Status Quo: The Official 40th Anniversary Edition. Cassell Illustrated, October 2006, hardcover, .Status Quo: La Route Sans Fin'', foreword by Bob Young, 
Eduard Soronellas Vidal (2008 – Spanish). Status Quo: Sobran Acordes, foreword by John 'Rhino' Edwards. Barcelona: Lenoir Ediciones.

External links

Status Quo official website
BBC Norfolk: Status Quo gig gallery – Thetford Forest 2008
Francis Rossi, Interview: "I Have Eight Children, and They All Vary" 18 May 2011
Status Quo's ultimate gig history compiled by Thomas Franck
 
 

 
1962 establishments in England
Musical groups established in 1962
Musical groups from London
Musical quartets
British rock and roll music groups
English hard rock musical groups
English psychedelic rock music groups
Mercury Records artists
Vertigo Records artists
A&M Records artists
Capitol Records artists
Eagle Records artists
Brit Award winners
Kerrang! Awards winners
Articles which contain graphical timelines